Richard Pilkington is a former lawn bowls competitor for New Zealand.

At the 1958 British Empire and Commonwealth Games in Cardiff he won the men's pairs gold medal partnering John Morris. He competed at the 1962 British Empire and Commonwealth Games as part of the men's fours team that placed 6th overall.

References

New Zealand male bowls players
Commonwealth Games gold medallists for New Zealand
Bowls players at the 1958 British Empire and Commonwealth Games
Living people
Year of birth missing (living people)
Commonwealth Games medallists in lawn bowls
Medallists at the 1958 British Empire and Commonwealth Games